The Minister for Fine Arts was a position in the Ministry of Dáil Éireann, the government of the Irish Republic, a self-declared state which was established in 1919 by Dáil Éireann, the parliamentary assembly made up of the majority of Irish MPs elected in the 1918 general election. The post was in existence only in the ministry formed at the beginning of the Second Dáil.

Minister for Fine Arts

1922 establishments in Ireland
Fine Arts
Ministries established in 1922